The tight end (TE) is an offensive position in American football, arena football, and Canadian football. It is a hybrid that combines the characteristics and roles of both an offensive lineman and a receiver. Like offensive linemen, they are usually lined up on the offensive line and are large enough to be effective blockers. On the other hand, unlike offensive linemen, they are eligible receivers and potent weapons in team's offensive schemes.

The tight end's role in any given offense depends on the preferences and philosophy of the head coach, offensive coordinator, and overall team dynamic. In some systems, the tight end will merely act as a sixth offensive lineman, rarely going out for passes. Other systems use the tight end primarily as a receiver, frequently taking advantage of the tight end's size to create mismatches in the defensive secondary. Many coaches will often have one tight end who specializes in blocking on running plays while using a tight end with better pass-catching skills in obvious passing situations.

Offensive formations may have as few as zero or as many as three tight ends at one time.

History
The advent of the tight end position is closely tied to the decline of the one-platoon system during the 1940s and '50s. Originally, a rule (derived from the game's evolution from other forms of football) limited substitutions. Consequently, players had to be adept at playing on both sides of the ball, with most offensive linemen doubling as defensive linemen or linebackers, and receivers doubling as defensive backs. At that time, the receivers were known as either ends or flankers, with an end lining up on either end of the line of scrimmage and the flanker positioned outside and behind them, at their "flank".

As the transition from starters going "both ways" to dedicated offensive and defensive squads took place, players roles continued to evolve, with those who did not fit the mold of the traditional positions being employed in newly created niches. Large and relatively swift players too small to play offensive lineman but who could both block and catch well became used in roles that capitalized on both of their strengths. Innovative coaches such as Paul Brown of the Cleveland Browns pioneered blocking techniques and passing schemes to use them to best effect.

Greater use of the tight end as a receiver in the 1960s both reflected and led to the emergence of stars at the position such as Mike Ditka, Jackie Smith, and John Mackey. In addition to superb blocking, Ditka offered great hands receiving and rugged running after the catch.  Over a 12-year career, he caught 427 passes for over 5,800 yards and 43 touchdowns. Mackey brought speed and open-field running, with six of his nine touchdown catches in one season being breakaways over 50 yards.  Smith provided the position with a previously unheard of ability to catch long balls downfield, as shown by his career average of 16.5 yards per catch.  This leads all tight ends in the Hall of Fame and is even ahead of a significant number of wide receivers enshrined there.

Still, tight ends remained primarily blockers lined up next to an offensive tackle and given short to medium drag routes.  Starting in 1980 the Air Coryell offense began using tight end Kellen Winslow in wide receiver-type routes.  Winslow was lined up wide, in the slot against a smaller cornerback, or put in motion to avoid being jammed at the line.  Defenses would cover him with either a strong safety or a linebacker, as zone defenses were less popular. Strong safeties in those times also were favored for their run defense over coverage speed. Providing them another defender to help cover Winslow opened up holes for other receivers. Winslow would line up unpredictably in any formation, variously in a three point blocking stance, two point receiver's stance, or put in motion like a flanker or offensive back. Head coach Jon Gruden referred to such multi-dimensional tight ends as "jokers", calling Winslow the first ever in the NFL. Patriots head coach Bill Belichick notes that the pass-catching tight ends that get paid the most are "all direct descendants of Kellen Winslow", and there are fewer tight ends now that can block on the line.

In the 1990s, Shannon Sharpe's athletic prowess as a route-runner helped change the way tight ends were used by teams. Consistently double-covered as a receiver, he became the first tight end in NFL history to rack up over 10,000 career receiving yards. Tony Gonzalez and Antonio Gates, who both played basketball in college, pushed the position toward wide receiver speed and power forward strength and wingspan. At 6'6" Rob Gronkowski brought height, setting single-season tight end records in 2011 with 17 touchdowns—breaking Gates's and Vernon Davis's record of 13—and 1,327 receiving yards, surpassing Winslow's record of 1,290. Jimmy Graham that season also passed Winslow with 1,310 yards. Six of the NFL's 15 players with the most receptions that year were tight ends, the most in NFL history. Previous seasons usually had at most one or two ranked in the top.

Tight ends generally hit their peak between the ages of 25 and 30.

In the Arena Football League the tight end serves as the 3rd offensive lineman (along with the center and guard). Although they are eligible receivers they rarely go out for passes and are usually only used for screen passes when they do.

However, in Canadian football, tight ends are, in general, no longer used professionally in the CFL, but are still used at the college level in U Sports. Tony Gabriel is a former great tight end in Canadian football. There remain some tight ends in use at university level football; Antony Auclair, formerly a tight end for the Laval Rouge et Or, was a contender to be selected in the 2017 CFL Draft or possibly receive a tryout in the NFL. He was drafted by the CFL's Saskatchewan Roughriders in 2017, but instead signed with the NFL's Tampa Bay Buccaneers as an undrafted free agent that same year.

Roles

Tight ends have two primary roles: (1) act as a blocker and (2) act as a receiver.

Blocking
In the National Football League (NFL), the tight end is larger, stronger, and slower than a wide receiver, and therefore able to block more effectively. Among offensive ball-handlers it is the job of the tight end, along with the fullback, to block for both running backs and receivers. Tight ends are used as blockers to protect the quarterback during passing plays, to open holes in the line, and downfield to tie up linebackers and defensive backs. 

Historically, a single tight end was used, typically placed on the right side of the offensive line.  In the early 2000s two tight end formations began to be used with more frequency. Specialty plays may deploy 3- or 4-tight-end sets in "heavy" or "jumbo" packages, usually to block in short-yardage situations or to sew confusion in the defensive backfield with such an unusual formation.  When a blocker larger than a tight end is desired without sacrificing they player's ability to catch a pass the position is sometimes filled by an offensive lineman who reports to the referee that he is an eligible receiver, referred to colloquially as a "tackle eligible".

Receiving
Historically, the primary role of a tight end was blocking, with strategic use as a receiver.  Over time the emphasis of offense has shifted from running to passing, and with it the role of the tight end as a receiver expanded.  The tight end is usually faster than the linebackers who cover him and often stronger than the cornerbacks and safeties who try to tackle him. In general, there is an inherent trade-off between a tight end's speed and agility and their size, meaning more mobile tight ends tend not to be as effective as blockers.  This results in great premiums being placed on tight ends that can fill both roles effectively.  When a team cannot find both in a single player they often rotate between those who are stronger in one role better than the other depending on the type of skill required by given plays.

At the extreme end the receiving spectrum are 'hybrid' tight ends that are drafted primarily for their pass-catching abilities.  Often, these players have near-wide receiver speed, coupled with greater overall size and strength.  Plays utilizing their assets are designed to capitalize on their combination of size, speed, and wingspan, at times spreading them out on the line like wide-receivers, off the line in the slot, or putting them in motion in the backfield.

Rushing
The decline of the fullback as a rushing position has seen the occasional deployment of tight ends as ball carriers, either aligned in the backfield or out of the slot in a reverse or sweep.

Physical attributes
They are usually among the taller members of the team, comparable in height to many linemen. They are also among its heavier players, with only linemen and some linebackers weighing more than averaged-sized tight ends.
As a result, tight ends are almost universally slower than wide receivers and running backs, although occasionally one with exceptional speed appears.  An example of a tight end with a speed advantage—at the expense of blocking ability—is   Vernon Davis, who achieved a 4.38 forty yard dash time.

Jersey numbers 

Specific skill positions typically are issued jersey numbers in a restricted range.  High school rules nationally are determined by the National Federation of State High School Associations; tight ends are able to wear any number other than 50–79. The NCAA "strongly recommends" ends wear 80–99, but this is not required. In the NFL, numbering regulations state that tight ends are restricted to 1–49 and 80–89 (numbers other receivers tend to wear also).  The 40–49 number range is a relatively recent addition to the rules (being made in 2015); as a result, most tight ends still bear numbers in the 80–89 range.

See also
 American football positions

References

Further reading

American football positions